Rasamay Dutt or Russomoy Dutt (1779 – May 14, 1854) was a notable Bengali educationist of British India during the Bengali Renaissance. He was the co founder of Hindu School, Kolkata. Bengali poet Toru Dutt was his grand daughter.

Early life 
Dutt was born in Rambagan, Kolkata. His father, Nilmani Dutt, was the founder of Dutt family. Rasamay Dutt started his profession by business and thereafter became a clerk and even became a judge of the Small Cause Court, Calcutta As such, he was the first Indian puisne judge of India. He was also the first Indian member of the Asiatic Society.

Social works 
Dutt was a linguist with special efficiency in English language. He was one of the founder of Hindu School in Kolkata and also set up Hindu College presently Presidency University with Ram Mohan Roy, Radhakanta Deb, David Hare. He became secretary of Council of Education and the first principal of Sanskrit college. After certain difficulties with Ishwar Chandra Vidyasagar he resigned from the post of Sanskrit College. Dutta was popular for his enormous contribution to poor students as a member of kolkata School Book Society. He was also engaged with Civil Society Movement, Anti press activities of state and support the Jury trial system in judicial works in India.

Family
From Rasamay Dutt's father sprang the famous Dutt family of Rambagan, Calcutta. Rasamay had two younger brothers, Harish and Pitambar; and five sons, Kissen, Kylas, Govin, Hur and Greece. His youngest brother Pitambar's sons were Ishan Chunder and Shoshee Chunder. Ishan was father of author Jogesh Chandra Dutt and author-cum-administrator Romesh Chunder Dutt. Rasamay's younger four sons were notable authors, Kylas being the first Indian author of a fictional work in English. Govin was the father of poetess Toru Dutt. British Communist leader Rajani Palme Dutt had also descended from this family.

References 

Indian schoolteachers
1779 births
1854 deaths
Indian Sanskrit scholars
Scholars of Hinduism
Bengali Hindus
Founders of Indian schools and colleges
Indian philanthropists
Fellows of learned societies of India
Indian educators
Educationists from India
Bengali educators
19th-century Bengalis
18th-century Bengalis
18th-century Indian educators
19th-century Indian educators
Educators from West Bengal
Indian social workers
18th-century Indian linguists
19th-century Indian linguists
Indian scholars
18th-century Indian scholars
19th-century Indian scholars
Indian social reformers